Delta of Venus is a 1994 American erotic drama film directed by Zalman King and starring Audie England, Costas Mandylor, and Marek Vašut. It is inspired by the posthumously published 1977 short story collection Delta of Venus by Anaïs Nin. NC-17 and R-rated versions of the film exist; the NC-17 rating is due to explicit sex. The DVD release contains both versions of the film. The film was released in June 1995 in the United States.

Plot 
Set in Paris, France, in 1940 in the early days of World War II before the German invasion and conquest of France, Elena Martin (Audie England) is a young American writer struggling to get by in Paris while searching for inspiration for her first novel. Elena meets and has a sordid affair with a fellow American expatriate named  Lawrence Walters (Costas Mandylor). With some encouragement from her friends, her lover, and her publisher, Elena gets involved in nude modeling and progresses onward through many other forms of voyeuristic and participatory sexual adventures as she further researches for inspiration to write her book and become an author of erotic fiction.

Cast 
 Audie England as Elena Martin
 Costas Mandylor as Lawrence Walters
 Eric Da Silva as Marcel
 Raven Snow as Leila
 Rory Campbell as Miguel
 Emma Louise Moore as Ariel
 Bernard Zette as Donald (as Zette)
 Marek Vasut as Luc
 Markéta Hrubesová as Bijou
 Daniel Leza as Pierre
 Stephen Halbert as Harry
 Dale Wyatt as Millicent
 Jirí Ded as Priest
 Valérie Zawadská as Landlady
 James Donahower as Bandleader
 Robert Davi as The Collector
 Adewale Akinnuoye-Agbaje as The Clairvoyant (as Wale)
 Clive Revill as Radio Announcer (voice)
 Roberta Hanley as Opium Den Proprietor

Background 
The novel by Anaïs Nin on which the film is based is not autobiographical, nor does it have a frame narrative. The film imposes a frame-narrative about a "Nin-like" American who begins an affair with another expatriate American in pre–World War II Paris, and who writes erotic stories that represent her fantasies. Some of these stories/fantasies, based on those of Nin, are explored on-screen.

References

External links
 

1990s erotic drama films
1994 films
1990s English-language films
Films set in Paris
New Line Cinema films
American erotic drama films
Films directed by Zalman King
Films scored by George S. Clinton
Films based on short fiction
1994 drama films
1990s American films